Rebekah Jones (born 1989) is an American geographer, data scientist, and activist and whistleblower. She managed the team that created the Florida Department of Health's COVID-19 dashboard using ArcGIS software. She was fired from her position in May 2020, which she said was due to her refusal to misrepresent COVID-19 data. In May 2021, she was granted whistleblower protections while the state investigated her allegations.

In May 2022, Florida's Office of Inspector General exonerated the state health officials, finding her claims against the DOH to be unsubstantiated or unfounded. In December 2022, she signed a deferred prosecution agreement admitting guilt to unauthorized use of the state's emergency alert system on November 10, 2020, which resulted in her home being raided by police in December 2020.

In the 2022 U.S. House of Representatives elections in Florida, Jones was the Democratic Party nominee against Matt Gaetz for Florida's 1st congressional district; she was defeated on November 8, 2022.

Early life and education
Jones was born in Windber, Pennsylvania to blue collar parents. At age 9, her family moved to Wiggins, Mississippi, where she spent most of her childhood. She grew up poor, often housing and food insecure. Jones graduated from Stone High School in 2007, after missing months of school due to the school's destruction during Hurricane Katrina in 2005. She says her experiences in Katrina made her interested in natural disasters. In her junior year, Jones was removed from class for refusing to stand for the Pledge of Allegiance and led other students to do the same after learning from civil liberties groups she was acting within her rights.

Jones graduated cum laude from the S. I. Newhouse School of Public Communications and Maxwell School of Citizenship and Public Affairs at Syracuse University with dual degrees in geography and journalism in 2012.

In 2014, she received a master's degree in geography and a minor in mass communication from Louisiana State University, where she won an award the same year from the Association of American Geographers. In 2015, her research titled Quantifying Extreme Weather Event Impacts on the Northern Gulf Coast Using Landsat Imagery was published in the Journal of Coastal Research.

Jones was a graduate student in the Department of Geography at Florida State University from 2016 through 2018 where she worked on a doctoral dissertation titled Using Native American Sitescapes to Extend the North American Paleotempestological Record Through Coupled Remote Sensing and Climatological Analysis.

Florida Department of Health
In September 2018, she became a geographic information system (GIS) analyst at Florida Department of Health (DOH) in Tallahassee and worked on the agency's emergency response team during Hurricane Michael and Hurricane Dorian. Jones performed analysis and modeling of mapping and surveillance data to provide information to the public and state officials used to coordinate disaster response, like the organization of patient movement to open beds between interstate hospitals. In November 2019, she was appointed to a manager role within GIS handling analysis and tracking of environmental health data and health services. She managed the team of data scientists and public health officers that used Esri's ArcGIS software to create the widely praised Florida Department of Health's COVID-19 dashboard.

Removal from the COVID-19 dashboard team
Jones managed the dashboard for two months. On May 4, 2020, a Miami Herald reporter made an inquiry to DOH about evidence they said could indicate an earlier community spread from the published data, which was handled by Jones's team. The Tampa Bay Times and The Palm Beach Post reported the data field was removed the same day, but returned on May 5. Shamarial Roberson, Deputy Secretary of Health, said the field was unimportant and indicated when a patient believed their symptoms began. A spokesperson for the Department of Health responded that the dates Jones referred to corresponded to dates when individuals may have come into contact with the virus, rather than dates when they tested positive. Carina Blackmore, the director for the division, instructed Jones to disable exporting data files to ensure the data matched what was in their PDF counterpart. Jones was adamant that broad access to complete raw data was crucial for the academic community. When instructed by her superiors to restrict access to any of the data, she objected, claiming it was unethical. In emails she said, "This is the wrong call," and "I'm not pulling our primary resource for coronavirus data because he (Pritchard) wants to stick it to journalists." Blackmore said the temporary removal was due to concerns about privacy and potential misunderstanding and misuse of the field. The following day, Jones was removed from the COVID-19 dashboard team. She threatened to quit and went on leave.

Firing from the Florida Department of Health 
On May 15, 2020, Jones sent an email to a public listserv suggesting her removal was punishment for a commitment to accessibility and transparency and should cast doubt on the data's integrity. On May 18, Jones was fired for insubordination, after refusing an offer to resign. The Associated Press reported that state records detailed repeated warnings by her supervisor not to publicly discuss her work without permission, including releasing unauthorized charts. The spokesperson for Florida governor Ron DeSantis said Jones was dismissed for making unilateral decisions about the dashboard without consulting others on the team. Her superiors testified that they were unaware that she had made raw data available for export that did not match. Jones disputes the state's claims and alleges that she was fired because she refused to manipulate data to indicate reopening readiness in rural counties to align with DeSantis's reopening plan.

Jones's allegations amounted to disagreements about methodology by which the state evaluated readiness to reopen. She opposed the way the state computed test positivity rates which had been previously announced on April 24 and believes that positive results for antibody testing should be included in cumulative case totals, which outside epidemiologists don't recommend as they can skew results. She also opposed a state policy on reopening of rural counties, which was permitted under federal guidelines to make low-population areas more resilient to small, containable spikes in cases. In emails obtained by Miami Herald, Carina Blackmore assembled a small team including Jones to "to develop new data for a reopening plan" at the end of April 2020. When the criteria supplied by the White House showed that highly populated counties were ready to open, but not rural counties, Blackmore suggested lower populations might be held to a different standard to account for natural social distancing. Jones alleged that the deputy health secretary, Shamarial Roberson, then ordered Jones to manually change the data to support reopening. The subsequent May 4 reopening resulted in a surge in cases, but DeSantis used an external task force, not the DOH, to make recommendations on reopening. DeSantis said, "It's not up to the health department to say a 'yes' or a 'no'." Jones alleged that the state ordered her to delete positive test results and deaths, and alleged the state was hiding such data to make the pandemic seem less deadly, which was referred to as a conspiracy theory. Discrepancies in death counts from Jones's understanding of the data came from nonresident deaths, which were forwarded to the deceased's home. DeSantis was criticized for reopening against the advice of epidemiologists. Florida reversed and slowed reopening the following month.

Jones filed a formal complaint in July 2020 for wrongful termination and misconduct of DOH officials. She was granted formal whistleblower protections by the Florida Office of Inspector General in May 2021 while investigation into her claims was ongoing. In May 2022, the Florida Office of Inspector General reported that her claims were unsubstantiated and lacked sufficient evidence, and exonerated officials she accused of wrongdoing. Marc Caputo of NBC News wrote that "the independent report paints a portrait of an employee who did not understand public health policy or the significance of epidemiological data, did not have high-level access to crucial information and leveled claims that made professional health officials 'skeptical.'" On October 26, 2022, Jones posted an altered image of a letter from the Florida Commission on Human Relations on her Instagram account, which she claimed proved that her whistleblower claims were validated. The caption read "Someone let Marc Caputo know he's a lying sack of s--t." The differences included adding a claim that she had "demonstrated a) violation of law 'which create and presents a substantial and specific danger to the public's health, safety, or welfare;' or b) actual or suspected 'gross mismanagement' as defined by the Act, …" and references to specific rules related to firing state employees. There were also inconsistencies in the text's formatting and style. She subsequently deleted the post, but maintains that the version Marc Caputo received from FCHR was the forgery. The Pensacola News Journal verified the digital copy they received was not modified after the day it was created and mailed to Jones.

Jones also alleged that the governor's office was micromanaging the health department, misleading the public about the state's vaccination data, and criticized DeSantis for pushing to reopen too early. These claims and criticisms were substantiated by journalists, but were not a part of the official reports Jones filed.

Police search warrant and deferred prosecution agreement 

On December 7, 2020, at 8:30 a.m., state police executed a search warrant upon Jones' home, where they confiscated electronic devices including her personal phone and laptop computer. She posted video of the encounter taken from a home security camera on Twitter. Florida Department of Law Enforcement said in a statement later that day that the warrant was issued because Jones was suspected of hacking into a Florida Department of Health computer system and sending an unauthorized message to members of the State Emergency Response Team on November 10, 2020. The alleged statement urged recipients to "speak up before another 17,000 people are dead". In a press interview later that morning, Jones denied sending the unauthorized message. She stated that because the authorities seized only her personal electronic devices and not other electronics in her house that could have been used to send the unauthorized message, she does not think she was the target of the investigation at all, but rather that her phone was seized so authorities could identify the Florida Department of Health workers with whom she had been communicating, including her confidential sources.

On January 16, 2021, an arrest warrant was issued for Jones by the Florida Department of Law Enforcement claiming she illegally breached state systems and downloaded the confidential contact information for nearly 20,000 people and sent a message to state employees telling them to "speak out." Jones stated she was not allowed to speak to the media about the charges because it could "result in the police 'stacking' additional charges".  Jones turned herself in on January 18 to the police, after which she tested positive for COVID.  After numerous case management hearings, a trial date was set for Jones's felony charge, scheduled for January 23, 2023.  On December 8, 2022, she entered into a deferred prosecution agreement to avoid trial, where among other requirements, she would have to admit guilt, pay a $20,000 fine to the Florida Department of Law Enforcement, do community service, and see a mental health professional monthly.

U.S. civil liberties watchdog Electronic Frontier Foundation warned about overreliance on IP addresses and called for the need to reform overbroad computer crime laws. Ars Technica and Forbes reported that the affidavit stated that the emergency alert system at the time the unauthorized message was sent used a single username and password, searchable by Google, calling into question if the act could be considered a "hack".

Dropped lawsuit
Jones filed a lawsuit on December 20, 2020, against the Florida Department of Law Enforcement and Commissioner Rick Swearingen alleging that the police obtained a "sham" search warrant whose true purpose was to retaliate against her. Her suit claimed that one of the FDLE agents grabbed her "without consent, authorization, or legitimate basis" while searching her home. She also alleged that the FDLE violated her First Amendment free speech rights, and had performed an unlawful search and seizure when they confiscated computers and her personal cell phone. Attorneys for Jones sought damages and a jury trial, stating in the 19-page lawsuit, which was filed in Leon County court, that "They entered her home with guns drawn, terrorizing her family." On February 6, 2021, court records show Jones dropped the lawsuit against the Florida Department of Law Enforcement, although the disposition of her seized property remains unresolved. Bodycam footage was later released by FDLE, though this footage did not show the officers entering the house, as seen in the footage from Jones's home security cameras.

Subsequent activities
After her firing, Jones launched an independent COVID-19 data dashboard for the state of Florida, which gained her a national award by Forbes. A Florida spokesperson criticized Jones's COVID-19 dashboard for including antibody tests, for counting virus tests with antibody tests, and for counting non-resident deaths.  The non-profit FinMango partnered with Jones for a national project.

In June 2021, she was suspended from Twitter for violations of the Twitter rules on spam and platform manipulation. Governor DeSantis's office welcomed the suspension, with a spokesperson calling it "long overdue" and accusing Jones of spreading "defamatory conspiracy theories".
 	
On December 8, 2022, it was announced that Jones would be hosting a new podcast, "Miss Informational" on Big Mouth Media, a new venture by former congressional candidate Dr. Cindy Banyai.

2022 Congressional candidacy

In May 2021, Jones announced that she would not run for congress, either in Maryland where she was living at the time, or in Florida, stating that she did not feel safe running in Florida, and that she was not well-enough prepared to run in Maryland. A day after her suspension from Twitter in June, she announced her intention to run against incumbent Matt Gaetz in the 2022 U.S. House elections but subsequently downplayed her announcement in another post, saying that if a Republican or Democratic challenger did not appear, "Well, November 2022 is a long ways away". Jones launched her campaign for Florida's first congressional district in July 2021. Although she filed with the FEC as an independent, she later had to change her filing to run as a Democrat due to voting and election law changes enacted before Jones declared her candidacy.

On July 15, 2022, a lawsuit was filed against Jones by her primary campaign opponent, Margaret "Peggy" Schiller and a Northwest Florida resident, asserting that Jones violated a state law that requires someone to be a member of a political party for a full year ahead of qualifying if they are running for that party's nomination. The suit sought an injunction to remove Jones from the primary ballot. She was removed from the ballot on August 5 after a judge ruled she failed to meet political party registration requirements. On August 12, Jones was granted a motion to stay with regards to her appeal of the ruling, allowing her to continue her campaign. On August 22, 2022, the 1st District Court of Appeals reversed the lower court ruling, letting Jones stay on the ballot as a valid candidate. On August 23, 2022, she won the Democratic primary election, and ran against Gaetz in the November general election, which she lost on November 8, 2022.

Legal issues
Jones has had prior criminal charges. At the time the search warrant was executed, Jones was facing an active misdemeanor charge on allegations of cyberstalking a former student of hers who was a romantic partner and publishing sexual details about their relationship online. She was fired from her Florida State University teaching position for threatening to give a failing grade to her romantic partner's roommate. She faced prior charges including felony robbery, trespass, and contempt of court stemming from an alleged violation of a domestic violence restraining order related to the same ex-boyfriend, but those charges were dropped. In 2017, she had been arrested and charged with criminal mischief in the vandalism of his car, but the charges were dropped.

Jones faced criminal charges in Louisiana in 2016 where she was arrested and charged by the LSU Police Department with one count each of battery on a police officer and remaining after forbidden and two counts of resisting arrest after refusing to vacate a Louisiana State University office upon being dismissed from her staff position.

Honors 
In 2020, Jones was recognized by Fortune magazine's 40 Under 40 in Healthcare for founding Florida COVID Action. She was named Forbess 2020 Technology Person of the Year for creating alternative Florida COVID-19 tracking dashboards.

See also
 Frances Haugen, former Facebook product manager and Facebook files whistleblower
 Ashley Gjøvik, former Apple program manager and whistleblower
 Rick Bright, former United States Department of Health and Human Services immunologist and whistleblower
 Peiter Zatko, former Twitter security chief and whistleblower

Notes

References

External links

 
Rebekah Jones for Congress campaign website
 Florida COVID Action Jones' alternate COVID-19 dashboard for the state of Florida

1989 births
Living people
21st-century American scientists
21st-century American women scientists
21st-century geographers
American geographers
American whistleblowers
Candidates in the 2022 United States House of Representatives elections
Louisiana State University alumni
Maxwell School of Citizenship and Public Affairs alumni
S.I. Newhouse School of Public Communications alumni
Scientists from Florida
Scientists from Mississippi
Women geographers
Geographic information scientists
Florida Democrats
21st-century American women politicians
21st-century American politicians
Women in Florida politics
Activists from Florida
Activists from Mississippi